2LDK is a 2003 Japanese film, directed by Yukihiko Tsutsumi as part of the Duel Project, starring Maho Nonami and Eiko Koike.

Two ambitious actresses, who share an apartment, learn they have been short-listed for the same part and that they have to wait for one more night to see who wins the part. As they bicker throughout the night, their competitiveness and hidden grudges turn their apartment into a battlefield.

Synopsis
Although aspiring actresses Nozomi (Koike) and Lana (Nonami) share a Tokyo apartment that's owned by their talent management agency, they're a world apart. Nozomi is a soft-spoken country girl from Sado Island who prides herself on being demure. City girl Lana, who grew up in a rough area of Tokyo, is more worldly, experienced and jaded.

Whilst in apartment, they learn they have auditioned for the same part in a highly anticipated film called Yakuza Wives and that there will be a phone call in the morning that will reveal who wins the role.

A conversation between two actresses turns sour, bringing their hidden resentment to the surface, which pushes them into committing a series of violent acts against each other while arguing over their backgrounds, lifestyles, choices, and love lives.

As they lay dying from severe injuries they inflicted on each other, their apartment phone finally rings at dawn. When it goes unanswered, it's switched to their answering machine. A male voice on the machine announces they both won the part.

Production
2LDK was paired with Ryuhei Kitamura's film Aragami as the Duel Project. Producer Shinya Kawai issued a challenge to directors Tsutsumi and Kitamura to create a feature-length movie each consisting a duel, two actors and one setting, along with a rule that the filming should take just one week.

Tsutsumi's 2LDK was filmed in eight days, with the cast and crew often working throughout the night.

The title is a Japanese real estate acronym for a 2-bedroom apartment with a Living-room, Dining-room, and Kitchen.

Releases
2LDK was released in DVD form in Japan, U.S. and Korean versions. It was also included in the 3-disc box set "Danger after Dark" (which includes Suicide Club and Moon Child as well). 2LDK, part of the Duel Project, was broadcast together with Aragami in Australia through Foxtel Television in 2005.

Remake
In 2012, The Wright Girls, a remake with Gemma Arterton, directed by Andy Fickman, and written by Bert Royal, was announced. By 2014 Fickman was replaced by Kevin Connolly, and Arterton by Jessica Alba.

See also
Aragami – Ryuhei Kitamura's Duel Project film.

References

External links

2LDK in Japanese Movie Database

2003 films
Films directed by Yukihiko Tsutsumi
2003 psychological thriller films
2000s Japanese-language films
Japanese psychological thriller films
2000s Japanese films